808:88:98 is a greatest hits album by English electronic music group 808 State. It was released on 18 May 1998 by ZTT Records.

Track listing
"Pacific 707"
"Cübik"
"Cobra Bora"
"In Yer Face"
"The Only Rhyme That Bites" (Extended Mix) 
"Olympic" (Flutey Mix)
"Ooops" 
"Lift" (EX:EL Mix)
"One in Ten" 
"Plan 9" (LP Mix)
"10 x 10" (Gorgeous Mix)
"Bombadin" (Quica Mix)
"Bond" 
"Azura" 
"Lopez" 
"Crash"
"Pacific" (808:98)

Pre-album remixes 

Pacific 808:98/Cübik:98 is a remix album released before 808:88:98. The album was split into two parts.

Pacific 808:98/Cübik:98 [Part 1] 

 Pacific:808:98Edit – 3:36
 Pacific:GrooveJeepMix – 8:22
 Pacific:707 – 3:56
 Cubik:Original – 3:35

Pacific 808:98/Cübik:98 [Part 2] 

 Cubik:98 – 4:43
 Cubik:MonkeyMafiaRemix – 6:40
 Pacific:Original – 6:28
 Pacific:303 – 6:28

References

808 State albums
1998 greatest hits albums